The fifth season of the American television comedy series How I Met Your Mother premiered on September 21, 2009 and concluded on May 24, 2010. It consists of 24 episodes, each running approximately 22 minutes in length. CBS broadcast the fifth season on Monday nights at 8:00 pm in the United States.

Cast

Main cast
 Josh Radnor as Ted Mosby
 Jason Segel as Marshall Eriksen
 Cobie Smulders as Robin Scherbatsky
 Neil Patrick Harris as Barney Stinson
 Alyson Hannigan as Lily Aldrin
 Bob Saget (uncredited) as Future Ted Mosby (voice only)

Recurring cast
 Lyndsy Fonseca as Penny, Ted's Daughter
 David Henrie as Luke, Ted's Son
 Marshall Manesh as Ranjit
 Joe Nieves as Carl, the owner of MacLarens Pub
 Charlene Amoia as Wendy the Waitress
 Cristine Rose as Virginia Mosby
 Ben Koldyke as Don Frank
 Chris Elliott as Mickey Aldrin

Guest cast
 Joe Manganiello as Brad Morris
 Tim Gunn as TV's Tim Gunn (Barney's personal tailor)
 Lindsay Sloane as Jen
 Rachel Bilson as Cindy
 JoAnna Garcia as Maggie
 Jennifer Lopez as Anita Appleby
 Stacy Keibler as Karina (Hot Bartender)
 Alan Thicke as himself
 Amanda Peet as Jenkins
 Laura Prepon as Karen
 Nick Swisher as himself
 Carrie Underwood as Tiffany
 Malin Åkerman as Movie Stella
 Chris Kattan as Jed Mosely
 Judy Greer as Royce
 Peter Bogdanovich as himself
 Hong Chau as Cook Pu
 Charles Chun as Mr. Park
 Sarah Wright as Claire
 Phillip Wilburn as Joe
 Jim Nantz as himself

Episodes

Reception
Reviews for season 5 of How I Met Your Mother were mixed. 

Cindy McLennan of Television Without Pity gave the season a negative review, and at the end of the season wrote: "I'm okay with any given season not being primarily focused on mother-meeting, but this season, the characters seemed to regress -- particularly Barney and Ted. Usually, when a season ends, I have to deal with a week or two weeks' worth of letdown. Right now, all I'm feeling is relief."

On the other hand, Amanda Sloane Murray from IGN gave the season a lukewarm review saying "So maybe this season didn't have the funniest jokes or the freshest material to work with. On the whole, it's not one that's going to stand out in our minds as one of the best seasons in the How I Met Your Mother canon; most of us are eager to forget Robin and Barney ever happened, Robin's co-anchor Don was switched up from funny guy to boring straight man and eventually discarded; nobody made significant strides in their career or their love life. Yet at the end of the day, a few loose ends suggest tantalizing possibilities for next season: Ted is now in possession of a house, while Marshall and Lily have decided to get pregnant. Our group is back together, unfettered by relationships inside or outside the inner circle, and we're happy to have it that way."

References

2009 American television seasons
2010 American television seasons
5